This is a list of the heritage sites in Caledon, situated in the Western Cape, as recognized by the South African Heritage Resources Agency.

|}

References

Western Cape
Tourist attractions in the Western Cape